Qadi Kola-ye Arateh (also Romanized as Qādī Kolā-ye Araţeh; also known as Qārī Kolā-ye Araţeh) is a village in Bisheh Sar Rural District, in the Central District of Qaem Shahr County, Mazandaran Province, Iran. At the 2006 census, its population was 2,172, in 587 families.

References 

Populated places in Qaem Shahr County